Kaipkire was a female warrior of the Herero people of Southern Africa in the 18th century.

Kaipkire  led resistance forces against British slave traders, and is celebrated among the Herero people. She is known in Namibia as a "legendary woman of resistance against the slave trade,''

References

Year of birth missing
Year of death missing
African women in war
African resistance to colonialism
Rebellions in Africa
Namibian rebels
Women in 18th-century warfare
Herero people